Citromycin is a chemical compound produced by Penicillium.  It was first discovered in 1969 and was found to have weak antibiotic activity.

References 

Antibiotics
Penicillium
Phenols
4-Pyrones